Masato Yamazaki may refer to:
Masato Yamazaki (footballer, born 1981) (山﨑 雅人), Japanese footballer
Masato Yamazaki (footballer, born 1990) (山﨑 正登), Japanese footballer